Highland Park is a neighborhood in the southwestern corner of Saint Paul, Minnesota, United States. Also known as Highland District Council (District 15), it lies along the Mississippi River just north of Fort Snelling and across the river from Minneapolis–Saint Paul International Airport. According to the 2000 census Highland Park had a population of 23,202.

Government
The Highland District Council is one of seventeen neighborhood district councils in Saint Paul. The district councils were formed in 1975 to advise the Saint Paul City Council on issues related to the development of its area as well as city and state issues. The HDC Board of Directors is composed of community volunteers elected to serve two-year terms.

History
The land that is today known as Highland park was once a part of the fort Snelling reserve, where no settlement was allowed until 1844, when a veteran of the Mexican–American War, William Finn was the first white person to settle in Highland Park permanently in 1848. He was granted a large portion of land along the Mississippi River and built a house on the land that the University of St. Thomas now occupies. During this time, much of the Highland Park area was encompassed by the Fort Snelling reservation but by the mid 1850s the government opened up most of that land for sale, and the area became Reserve Township. This sale opened up the area for settlement, and the area in Ramsey County that was first settled became the last in Saint Paul to be densely populated. Highland Park became part of the City of Saint Paul in 1887, when Reserve Township was purchased. 

From 1925 to 2011, the Ford Motor Company opened the Twin Cities Assembly Plant (originally for Model T automobiles) in Highland Park and caused much of the remaining farm land in the area to be subdivided for the auto workers. Soon after, in 1927, the Intercity Bridge was built to carry workers over the river from Minneapolis to work in the plant. Construction started in 1927 on the Highland Park Water Tower, a structure that still stands today and has become a landmark on the highest part of Saint Paul.

Following World War II Highland Park experienced another population boom, a large number of new houses were built, the Highland Village Shopping Center was expanded and the Sibley Plaza Shopping Center was finished.

Community

Highland Park currently is a mix of well maintained older housing, commercial and retail property and light industrial buildings. The Ford Plant is no longer open, and announced on April 13, 2006 that the Twin Cities plant would close in 2008, along with the Norfolk, Virginia Ford F-series pickup plant. Ford later reached an agreement with the United Auto Workers which would keep the plant open until 2009. In September 2017, the St. Paul City Council approved a master plan and zoning designed to redevelop the  site and add as many as 4,000 new housing units. In April 2021, the St. Paul City Council approved the names of four new parks to be developed within the former Ford site with support from the Saint Paul Parks and Recreation Commission. These new parks names received final input from members of the Dakota community and the Saint Paul Youth Commission. These four parks were Gateway Park, Assembly Union Park, UÅeÄii MakÈa Park (oon-CHEE Ma-KAH, "Mother Earth" in Dakota), and MíÄia Park (MEE-cha, abbreviation for "coyote" in Dakota). On June 14, 2022, Gateway Park opened in the former Ford Plant site, now known as Highland Bridge, this will be one of four parks that will open for the redevelopment of Highland Bridge from the former empty Ford site into new housing units and parks. Gateway Park includes a skating trail and bowl, biofiltration basin, and a stormwater pond with nature trails that run the length of the park.

Highland Park became the city's primary Jewish neighborhood after most of the Jewish population moved from the Summit-University neighborhood in the mid-1900s, and it is home to most of the city's synagogues.

Highland Park is served locally by the Villager newspaper which has a subscription base of 65,000. The Highland Park Business Association in cooperation with local community volunteers presents Highland Fest, in the Highland Village, an annual festival that features music, carnival rides, an art fair and fireworks.

The neighborhood's public schools are Highland Park Elementary, Horace Mann Elementary, and EXPO for Excellence Elementary school, Highland Park Middle School (formerly Highland Park Junior High) for Middle School, and Highland Park Senior High School for High School Education. Saint Catherine's University is also located in the neighborhood, as well as several private schools.

Two of the oldest and largest parks in Saint Paul parks lie at along the Mississippi River bank, Crosby Farm and Hidden Falls. Across the Mississippi River, Pike Island in Fort Snelling State Park is technically within the neighborhood's boundary.

Demographics
As of 2020, the population of Highland Park was 25,111, split 48.5% male and 51.5% female.

14.7% of the population were foreign-born residents, and 17.5% spoke a language other than English at home. 8.1% of residents spoke English less than "very well".

11.7% of households had no access to a vehicle. Among workers 16 years and older, 73.4% commuted to work via car, 7.0% used public transit, and 19.6% walked, biked, worked at home, or used some other method. 9.2% of residents lived below the poverty line, and 2.2% were unemployed. 46.2% of housing in the neighborhood was renter-occupied.

References

External links
 Highland District Council
 The Highland Business Association

Neighborhoods in Saint Paul, Minnesota
Minnesota populated places on the Mississippi River